Miharu Imanishi was the defending champion, but decided not to participate this year.

Johanna Konta won the title, defeating Stéphanie Foretz 6–2, 6–4 in the final.

Seeds

Draw

Finals

Top half

Bottom half

References
Main Draw

Challenger Banque Nationale de Granby
Challenger de Granby